Horn Quarter is a historic home located near Manquin, King William County, Virginia.  It was built about 1830, and is a two-story, three bay by three bay, rectangular brick dwelling in the Federal style.  It has a double-pile, central hall plan and is set on a brick foundation. The front facade features its original tetrastyle Roman Doric order pedimented portico with paired stuccoed columns and pilasters.

It was listed on the National Register of Historic Places in 1980.

References

Houses on the National Register of Historic Places in Virginia
Federal architecture in Virginia
Houses completed in 1830
Houses in King William County, Virginia
National Register of Historic Places in King William County, Virginia
1830 establishments in Virginia